Philip Douglas Broadhurst  (26 June 1949 – 24 April 2020) was a New Zealand composer, jazz pianist, music lecturer and radio presenter.

Career
Broadhurst hosted the Art of Jazz programme on Radio New Zealand for more than 20 years.

From 2000 until 2016, Broadhurst was Head of Jazz Studies at the New Zealand School of Music at Massey University's Albany campus in Auckland.

The 2011 album Delayed Reaction was a tribute to Michel Petrucciani and was reviewed favourably in the JazzTimes.

Honours and awards
In the 2001 Queen's Birthday Honours, Broadhurst was appointed a Member of the New Zealand Order of Merit, for service to jazz music.

At the NZ Music Awards in 2016, Broadhurst won Jazz Tui for the third album Panacea from his Dedication trilogy.

Personal life
Broadhurst lived in Auckland with his wife Julie Mason. He died on 24 April 2020, aged 70.

Discography
 Sustenance, 1982
 Iris, 1985
 Sustenance 3, 1987
 Live at The London Bar, 1993
 Delayed Reaction, 2011
 Flaubert’s Dance, 2013
 Panacea, 2015

See also
 Nathan Haines

References

External links
 
 
 Phil Broadhurst Quartet on Spotify

1949 births
2020 deaths
APRA Award winners
New Zealand composers
Members of the New Zealand Order of Merit